is a passenger railway station located in the city of Chichibu, Saitama, Japan, operated by the private railway operator Chichibu Railway.

Lines
It is served by through services to and from the Seibu Chichibu Line, and is also located a short walk from the terminus of the Seibu Chichibu Line, Seibu-Chichibu Station.

Station layout

The station is staffed and consists of two side platforms serving two tracks.

Platforms

Adjacent stations

History

Ohanabatake Station opened on 27 September 1917. From 1 April 2009, "Shibazakura" was added in parentheses to the station name, indicating the station's closeness to the nearby Hitsujiyama Park, which is a popular sightseeing destination in early summer when the moss phlox (shibazakura) blooms.

Passenger statistics
In fiscal 2018, the station was used by an average of 2662 passengers daily.

Surrounding area
 Seibu-Chichibu Station (Seibu Chichibu Line)
 Chichibu City Office
 Saitama Prefectural Chichibu High School
 Chichibu Shrine
 Hitsujiyama Park, famous for moss phlox (shibazakura) in early summer

References

External links

 Ohanabatake Station information (Saitama Prefectural Government) 
 Ohanabatake Station timetable 

Railway stations in Saitama Prefecture
Railway stations in Japan opened in 1917
Chichibu, Saitama